Ucha  is a village in Kapurthala district of Punjab State, India. The village is administrated by a Sarpanch, who is an elected representative.

Demography 
According to the report published by Census India in 2011, Ucha has total number of 422 houses and population of 2,082 of which include 1,127 males and 955 females. Literacy rate of Ucha is 78.56%, higher than state average of 75.84%.  The population of children under the age of 6 years is 221 which is 10.61% of total population of Ucha, and child sex ratio is approximately 826, lower than state average of 846.

Population data

Notable people 
Sukhdev Singh Bhangu, Former Assistant Professor, PAU Ludhiana.

Er. Darshan Singh Bhangu, Addl.SE, JALANDHAR, PSPCL Punjab.

Culture 
All the population speaks Punjabi which is the mother tongue as well as the official language here.

Religion 
As of religion, Sikhism predominates the village with other minorities.

Air travel connectivity 
The closest airport to the village is Sri Guru Ram Dass Jee International Airport.

Villages in Kapurthala

References

External links
  Villages in Kapurthala
 Kapurthala Villages List

Villages in Kapurthala district